Curtis Media Group is a broadcast media company based in Raleigh, North Carolina, United States.  The company owns and operates several North Carolina radio stations and television networks.

Broadcast stations
 
Curtis Media Group owns and operates the following stations:

Radio

AM
WPTF 680 AM (Raleigh, North Carolina)
WQDR 570 AM (Raleigh, North Carolina)
WGBR 1150 AM (Goldsboro, North Carolina)
WFMC 730 AM (Goldsboro, North Carolina)
WKIX 850 AM (Raleigh, North Carolina)
WXIT 1200 AM (Blowing Rock, North Carolina)
WATA 1450 AM (Boone, North Carolina)
WECR 1130 AM (Newland, North Carolina)
WWMC 1010 AM (Kinston, North Carolina)
WSSG 1300 AM (Goldsboro, North Carolina)
WNCT 1070 AM (Greenville, North Carolina)

FM
WQDR-FM 94.7 FM (Raleigh, North Carolina)
WBBB 96.1 FM (Raleigh, North Carolina)
WPLW-FM 96.9 FM (Goldsboro, North Carolina)
WKJO 102.3 FM (Smithfield, North Carolina)
WKXU 102.5 FM (Hillsborough, North Carolina)
WKIX-FM 102.9 FM (Raleigh, North Carolina)
WYMY 101.1 FM (Burlington, North Carolina)
WZKT 97.7 (Walnut Creek, North Carolina)
WMMY 106.1 FM (Jefferson, North Carolina)
WWMY 102.3 FM (Beech Mountain, North Carolina)
WZJS 100.7 FM (Banner Elk, North Carolina)
WELS-FM 102.9 FM (Kinston, North Carolina)
WMGV 103.3 FM (Newport, North Carolina)
WMJV 99.5 FM (Grifton, North Carolina)
WSFL-FM 106.5 FM (New Bern, North Carolina)
WIKS 101.9 FM (New Bern, North Carolina)

Radio networks
North Carolina News Network, broadcast news service for 75 affiliate stations in North Carolina;
Triangle Traffic Network, traffic reporting service in the Raleigh Durham Metro;
Southern Farm Network, agriculture reporting service for North and South Carolina;
Triad Sports Network, sports programming in the Greensboro, High Point, Winston-Salem market

Internet
North Carolina News Network
 www.StateGovernmentRadio.com
 SFNtoday.com
 ACCsports.com

History
The company was founded in 1968 by Don Curtis as a cable TV provider. CMG is the largest privately held broadcast company in North Carolina, and claims that WQDR-FM is the highest-billing radio station in the state. Don Curtis formed a company, Inner Banks Broadcasting, in partnership with eastern North Carolina broadcaster Henry Hinton, which in 2006 purchased WMFR from CBS Radio, and simulcasts talk WSJS and WSML.

External links
 Official website

Mass media in North Carolina
Companies based in North Carolina
Radio broadcasting companies of the United States